Mohammad-Vali Khan, Khalatbari Tonekāboni (1846 – 18 September 1926),  known as Sepahdar A'zam, was the leader of the constitutionalist revolutionary forces from Iran's Northern provinces of Gilan and Mazandaran and known as one of the greatest statesmen and military commanders of Persian history as well as its wealthiest nobleman.

Biography 
He served as colonel for ten years and became Minister of Post and Telegraph as well as Minister of Customs where he was in charge of all imports into and exports out of the Persian empire. Later he became Minister of Treasury where he was singlehandedly in charge of the entire country's coin issue. He also held the title of Minister of Defence and was Prime Minister for four terms. His highest military title was Commander in Chief. He was of the Khalatbari family.

As an ethnic Persian, Sepahsalar Khalatbari was the only leader who was able to restore security inside Persia by controlling the ethnic Turkomans inside the kingdom. He was called upon many times by not only the various sectors of the Persian government but also by the Russians to suppress the Turkomans. His enormous wealth with income estimated at US$2 million/year in the early 1900s (the equivalent of $530 million/year in 2000) allowed him to be the chief financier of the Persian Empire where he would use his property as collateral for loans the kingdom obtained from Russia and Britain.

In 1909 he was given the title Sepahdar Azam and was sent by then King Mohammad Ali Shah to crush the Azerbaijani constitutionalist uprising in the northwest headed by Baqer Khan and Sattar Khan. He arrived in Azerbaijan but refused to fight the constitutionalist forces deeming it "fratricide". Instead he returned to Tonekabon and due to his genius military skill and national democratic following became the leader of the constitutionalist and anti-royalist forces, the same forces he was sent to crush. As their new leader he first occupied the city of Qazvin and then marched onto Tehran.

During his march to Tehran the Russian foreign ministry in Saint Petersburg sent a telegram to the Russian Embassy in Tehran stating:
"Please inform His Excellency Sepahdar Azam that if he and his army peacefully march on Tehran and then proceed to the house of Saad al Dowleh, then on the authority of this telegram, Sepahdar Azam and all his relatives and kin will be placed in the protection of the Tsarist government."

Sepahdar Azam (Khalatbari Tonekaboni) wrote back
"The Russian government believes I have done all this for my own personal gain. For Iran's freedom and independence and as a Shia Muslim I have to obey  Najaf Religious leaders decree to help and support constitutionalist forces."

Rejecting the Tsarist government's request, he continued his march and forced the royalists in Tehran to surrender. King Mohammad Ali Shah fled and sought refuge in the Russian embassy, then left Persia altogether. He accepted the title of Sepahsalar (Commander in Chief).   Sepahsalar-e Khalatbari Tonekaboni  became Minister of Defence in the first constitutionalist government that followed dethroning of King Mohammad Ali Shah Qajar in 1909. He subsequently became Prime Minister of Iran four times. As the largest property owner in Persia his noble "Khan" status allowed him to  rule several fiefdoms in Gilan and Mazandaran provinces, including the city and regions surrounding Tonekabon.

Sepahsalar Khalatbari Tonekaboni continued to fight the religious clerics' attempts to create a theocracy as well as the ruling establishments attempts to continue a monarchy. He took frequent trips to France to learn the French system of representative democracy.

With the advent of the Pahlavi dynasty and the Reza Khans, imposed by the British in the 1920s, Sepahsalar Khalatbari Tonekaboni was placed under increased political pressure. Much of his property was seized by the new government in an attempt to control his wealth and his power.  His favorite son, Colonel Ali Asghar Khan, killed suspiciously in Lashkarak Hunting-ground.

On July 16, 1926,  Sepahsalar Khalatbari Tonekaboni committed suicide. His last note, written to his eldest son Amir Asad, read: "Amir Asad, right away take my body to the shrine for cleansing and burial next to my son Saad al Dowleh. Do it now. For after living eighty years no mourning or tears are needed for me."

See also
 Sardar As'ad Bakhtiari
Bagh-e Ferdows

References

Sources
 Cyrus Ghani: Iran and the rise of Reza Shah. From Qajar collapse to Pahlavi rule. I. B. Tauris, London u. a. 1998, S. 78.

1848 births
1926 deaths
People from Mazandaran Province
Prime Ministers of Iran
People of the Persian Constitutional Revolution
Iranian politicians who committed suicide
20th-century Iranian politicians
19th-century Iranian politicians
Governors of East Azerbaijan Province
Moderate Socialists Party politicians
Members of the 1st Iranian Majlis
People from Tonekabon
Qajar governors of Gilan